Level Plane was an American independent record label based in New York City that was founded in early 1997 by Greg Drudy for the release of Saetia's first 7". Drudy ran the label until it ceased to exist in 2009. It released records in a variety of styles including those by many screamo bands.

Roster

 A Day in Black and White
 Air Conditioning
 Amanda Woodward
 Anodyne
 Aussitôt Mort
 Bloody Panda
 Books Lie
 Bright Calm Blue
 Bucket Full of Teeth
 City of Caterpillar
 Coliseum
 The Conversions
 Defeatist
 Drain the Sky
 Envy
 The Fiction
 Forstella Ford
 Get Fucked
 Get Rad
 Gospel
 Graf Orlock
 The Hidden Chord
 The Holy Shroud
 Hot Cross
 Jeromes Dream
 Kaospilot
 Landmine Marathon
 Lickgoldensky
 Life at These Speeds
 Life Detecting Coffins
 Light the Fuse and Run
 Louise Cyphre
 Malady
 Melt-Banana
 Mikoto
 The Minor Times
 Muslimgauze
 Neil Perry
 Newgenics
 North of America
 The Now
 Oil
 The One AM Radio
 pg. 99
 Ruhaeda
 Racebannon
 Saetia
 Saviours
 Shikari
 Sinaloa
 The State Secedes
 Thou
 Tombs
 Transistor Transistor
 Usurp Synapse
 Van Johnson
 the Vidablue 
 Warwolf
 You and I

See also
 List of record labels
 :Category:Level Plane Records albums

References

External links

American record labels
Post-hardcore record labels
Record labels established in 1997
Alternative rock record labels
Ambient music record labels
Experimental music record labels